Mount Austin High School is a government-funded co-educational comprehensive secondary day school, located in Wagga Wagga, in the Riverina region of New South Wales, Australia.

Established in 1964, the school enrolled approximately 429 students in 2018, from Year 7 to Year 12, of whom 45 percent identified as Indigenous Australians and 8 percent were from a language background other than English. The school is operated by the NSW Department of Education; and the acting principal is Michelle Waugh.

Notable alumni 
 Adam Mullavey, detector controls engineer at the Laser Interferometer Gravitational-Wave Observatory, involved in the first observation of gravitational waves.
 Mark Taylor (cricketer), cricketer

See also 

 List of government schools in New South Wales
 List of schools in the Riverina
 Education in Australia

References

External links

 Official website
 NSW Schools website

Public high schools in New South Wales
1964 establishments in Australia
Educational institutions established in 1964
Education in Wagga Wagga